The St.Mother Teresa High School is a co-education school located at R.K.Puram, Neredmet, Secunderabad, India. It was established in 9 September 1999. Mother Teresa Educational Academy was founded by Smt. Anil Kumari PG, PMIR, (Chairperson cum founder of MTEA) in the year 1999.

Children are schooled from the primary stage through to the 10th standard (age 3 to age 15). Its administrative body is the Mother Teresa Educational Academy.

History 
In September 1999 it was recognized by state Govt. The school is named as St. Mother Teresa Known as tradition as she was the mother of all (for all needy people). The school is affiliated to SSC syllabus. The school's motto is "TRUTH IS GOD" & "LEARN N SERVE"

Competitions and events 
Annual Competitions and Events are organized

Sports Day

Concert

Music Day

Annual Day

Inter House 
Debate

Quiz

Football

Cricket

Tennis

Singing

Dancing

Drawing and Craft

Facilities. 
 Assembly hall.
 The computers, biology, chemistry and physics labs.
 The Administrative block- Administration.
 The parking space.
 The School also has indoor games like carrom, chess.
 The school also provides library with over 500 books.
 A library, art and music room.
 All classrooms are provided by projectors and smart class.
 School has fire safety equipment.

Upcoming facilities 
 Table Tennis
 Badminton

See also
Education in India
List of schools in India

References

External links 

Primary schools in India
High schools and secondary schools in Telangana
Schools in Secunderabad
Educational institutions established in 1999
1999 establishments in Andhra Pradesh